This is an alphabetical list of countries by past and projected gross domestic product (nominal) as ranked by the IMF. Figures are based on official exchange rates, not on the purchasing power parity (PPP) methodology. Values are given in millions of United States dollars (USD) and have not been adjusted for inflation. These figures have been taken from the International Monetary Fund's World Economic Outlook (WEO) Database (October 2022 edition) and/or other sources.

For older GDP trends, see List of regions by past GDP (PPP).

UN estimates between 1970 and 1979
The following Table is based on UN GDP data.

* indicates "GDP of COUNTRY or TERRITORY" or "Economy of COUNTRY or TERRITORY" links.

IMF estimates between 1980 and 1989

IMF estimates between 1990 and 1999

IMF estimates between 2000 and 2009

IMF estimates between 2010 and 2019

IMF projections for 2020 through 2027

The following list contains the various countries' projected GDP (nominal) from 2020 to 2027.

CIA estimates in 1990 
GDP (Nominal) data in 1990, with some countries only GNP (Nominal) was provided by the CIA World Factbook.

GDP milestones by countries (in trillions USD)
The following is a list of countries reaching (or predicted to reach) a certain threshold of nominal GDP in a specific year according to International Monetary Fund, United Nations, and World Bank. Future predictions are marked with an asterisk.

Long term GDP estimates

The following table provides GDP estimates for the 15 largest economies from 1980 to 2075 made by Goldman Sachs in December 2022.

The following table provides GDP estimates for the 20 largest economies from 2022 to 2037 made by the U.S.-based Center for Business and Economic Research, a division of Ball State University, in December 2022.

See also
 List of IMF ranked countries by GDP, IMF ranked GDP (nominal), GDP (nominal) per capita, GDP (PPP), GDP (PPP) per capita, Population, and PPP
 List of countries by GDP (nominal)
 List of countries by past and projected GDP (PPP)

References
International Monetary Fund (IMF), World Economic Outlook (WEO) database, October 2021 edition, gross domestic product, current prices, (millions of) U.S. dollars.

External links
IMF website
2022 October World Economic Outlook (WEO) Database

Lists of countries by GDP